Hinomine Dam is a concrete gravity dam located in Saga Prefecture in Japan. The dam is used for food water control and water supply. The catchment area of the dam is 0.4 km2. The dam impounds about 7  ha of land when full and can store 460 thousand cubic meters of water. The construction of the dam was started on 1982 and completed in 2001.

References

Dams in Saga Prefecture
2001 establishments in Japan